Morawy may refer to the following places:
Morawy, the Polish name for Moravia
Morawy, Kuyavian-Pomeranian Voivodeship (north-central Poland)
Morawy, Masovian Voivodeship (east-central Poland)
Morawy, Pomeranian Voivodeship (north Poland)